KSJD (91.5 FM), is a National Public Radio-affiliated station in Cortez, Colorado. It primarily features National Public Radio programming. The station is currently owned by Community Radio Project.

Translators
In addition to the main station, KSJD is relayed by an additional two translators to widen its broadcast area.  It is also digitally relayed to Rico, Colorado with an FM frequency of 89.5.

Location
The station is based in the historic Montezuma Valley National Bank building in Cortez, Colorado.

See also
List of community radio stations in the United States

References

External links
 KSJD official website
 

KSJD
SJD
Community radio stations in the United States